Jean Noli (1928 in Genoa – 8 May 2000 in Paris) was a French-speaking writer and journalist of Italian origin.

Biography 
Jean Noli resided for a long time in France, dividing his time between Paris and the Breton island of Hoëdic. He is known to have written a biography of Edith Piaf. Several of his novels are inspired by the sea and the Breton islands. He has been a co-author of books on sailors Olivier de Kersauson,  and Éric Tabarly.

The island of Hoëdic is the site of his novel , which earned him the 1978 prix des libraires.

As a journalist and rewriter, Jean Noli collaborated for several years in the weekly VSD from its inception in 1977.

Work 
 1970: Les Loups de l'Amiral, Fayard
 1971: Le Choix — prix Broquette-Gonin
 1977: La Grâce de Dieu — Julliard,  prix des libraires
 1980: La Banquière,  
 1981: Larguez les mémoires,  Éditions maritimes et d'outre-mer 
 1985: La Mariée de l'ombre, Plon,  
 1986: Vengeance
 1991: Mor Bihan 
 1993: Piaf secrète
 1996: Chers Italiens, 

In collaboration with Olivier de Kersauson:
 1979: Fortune de mer 
 1994: Homme libre... toujours tu chériras la mer !

External links 
 Jean Noli on Babelio
 Jean Noli on the site of the Académie française
 Jean Noli obituary on Le Point (12 May 2000)
 L' écrivain Jean Noli sur hoedic en 1977 (partie 1) on YouYube

Winners of the Prix Broquette-Gonin (literature)
Prix des libraires winners
20th-century French  journalists
French male journalists
1928 births
Italian emigrants to France
2000 deaths
20th-century French novelists
French  male novelists